Høvik Verk is a district in the municipality of Bærum, Norway. Its population as of 2007 is 3,940.

References

Villages in Akershus
Bærum